& YOU revolution is Sifow's first mini album, and was self-released in early 2006.  It contains various self-released songs from the previous year.

& YOU revolution peaked at #281 on the Oricon Charts.

Track listing 
 "Jewel" – 5:01
 "& YOU revolution" – 5:01
 "I Uta" ("I謡") – 4:00
 "Mermaid Story" ("マーメィドストーリィ") – 3:54
 "Apple ~Aka Ringo~" ("Apple ~Red Apple~", "Apple～赤りんご～") – 5:32

References 

Sifow albums
2006 albums
Avex Group albums
Japanese-language albums